The 2016–17 UNLV Lady Rebels basketball team will represent the University of Nevada, Las Vegas during the 2016–17 NCAA Division I women's basketball season. The Lady Rebels, led by ninth year head coach Kathy Olivier. They play their home games at the Thomas & Mack Center and the Cox Pavilion on UNLV's main campus in Paradise, Nevada. They are a member of the Mountain West Conference.

Roster

Schedule
Source:

|-
!colspan=9 style="background:#; color:white;"| Non-conference regular season

|-
!colspan=9 style="background:#; color:white;"| Mountain West regular season

|-
!colspan=9 style="background:#; color:#C10202;"| Mountain West Women's Tournament

Rankings
2016–17 NCAA Division I women's basketball rankings

See also
 2016–17 UNLV Runnin' Rebels basketball team

References 

UNLV
UNLV Lady Rebels basketball seasons
2017 Women's National Invitation Tournament participants
Rebels
Rebels